Remigio Ángel González is a Mexican-born owner of the Latin American media network Albavisión. He has lived in Miami since 1987. The network (previously named Televideo Services) is named for his wife Alba Elvira Lorenzana, who is from Guatemala. González was estimated to be worth $350m in 2002, and by some accounts is now worth $2bn. González has a conservative political stance, but he aims to keep a low profile and cooperate with host country governments. As part of this strategy, he is said to have modified the editorial lines of his stations, particularly in Guatemala and Nicaragua, to accommodate government preferences.

Albavisión
The foundation for the Albavisión network, created in May 2008, was laid in 1981 when González acquired his two Guatemalan television stations (Canal 3 and 7). At the time, González was a sales representative for Mexico's Televisa, selling its programming in Central America, and used Televisa's loan backing to acquire the station. In the mid-1990s he acquired Guatemala's Canal 13, and completed a "virtual monopoly control of that nation's commercial television airwaves".

In January 2010 the Albavision network had 26 television stations (including La Red (Chile), ATV (Peru), SNT (Paraguay) and Canal 9 (Argentina) and 82 radio stations. Many Latin American countries have laws restricting foreign ownership, and as a result the network has a range of "phantom companies run by local relatives, friends and stand-ins"; his Guatemalan properties are in his (Guatemalan) wife's name.

Through Albavision, González controls four television stations in Guatemala—El Super Canal, Televisiete , Teleonce and Trecevisión—attaining a monopoly of commercial television channels inside the country. He also controls three of Nicaragua's nine television stations (Channels 10 and 4 (until 2018)). As of May 2018, all the stations González owns, operates or advises in Nicaragua have sons and daughters of Nicaraguan President Daniel Ortega, an associate of González, running them. González also owns three stations in Costa Rica, as well as five in the south of his native México. channel 13 méxico 

A 2001 study of González's media properties in Guatemala and Nicaragua found that they had a tendency to squeeze out voices opposed to the government, and concluded that "Gonzalez’s ownership practices create an atmosphere that undercuts the development of democracy." He has a strong influence in Guatemalan politics, for example giving $650,000 to Vinicio Cerezo's 1985 presidential campaign, as well as more than $2.6 million and free airtime to Alfonso Portillo's 1999 campaign. "Political analysts say the free commercials helped Portillo win the election." After becoming president, Portillo "named Gonzalez's brother-in-law, Luis Rabbe, as his minister of communications, infrastructure and housing, a powerful Cabinet position whose jurisdiction includes the oversight of broadcast media."

As of August 2018, Gonzalez owned 35 television channels, 114 radio stations and two newspaper companies in 11 Latin American countries.

References 
http://www.poder360.com/article_detail.php?id_article=5236&pag=1

External links

Living people
1944 births
Mexican television company founders
Businesspeople from Nuevo León